The Sukkur Airport , also known as Begum Nusrat Bhutto International Airport Sukkur, is a domestic airport located in Sukkur, Sindh, Pakistan.

Sukkur International Airport is the second main operational airport in Sindh, after Jinnah International Airport, Karachi. The paved runway is about 2,700 metres long. It also handles international flights, especially in time of emergencies and because of bad weather conditions.

On 26 January 2012, the Provincial Assembly of Sindh unanimously passed a resolution to name the airport after Nusrat Bhutto, a former first lady of Pakistan in the 1970s.

During Hajj season every year, Hajj flights operate from Sukkur to Jeddah and Medina in the Kingdom of Saudi Arabia and back. The first Hajj flight from the Begum Nusrat Bhutto Airport, Sukkur, left for Jeddah on 6 August 2016. The flight operation continued until 13 August 2016.

Planned upgrades and expansion 
In September 2022, the Pakistan Civil Aviation Authority assigned the upgrade and expansion project of the Begum Nusrat Bhutto Airport Sukkur to the National Engineering Services Pakistan. According to the plan, the airport is planned to be turned into an international airport for wide-body aircraft with all allied facilities. The renovation project includes extension of the runway and the taxiway, reconstruction of the apron and terminal building, along with other related facilities.

International Status 
In September 2022, The Civil Aviation Authority (CAA) accelerated the process of granting international status to Begum Nusrat Bhutto Airport (BNBA) in Sukkur.

After getting international status, it is the second-largest international airport in Sindh.

Airlines and destinations

See also 
 Begum Nusrat Bhutto
 List of airports in Pakistan
 Airlines of Pakistan
 Begum Nusrat Bhutto Women University
 Transport in Pakistan
 Pakistan Civil Aviation Authority

References

Airports in Sindh
Sukkur